Bab Torsh (also Romanized as Bāb Torsh and Bāb-e Torsh; also known as Darreh Torsh and Darreh Tursh) is a village in Sarduiyeh Rural District, Sarduiyeh District, Jiroft County, Kerman Province, Iran.

In the 2006 census, its population was 151, with 20 families.

References 

Populated places in Jiroft County